The Stour Music Festival is a festival of early music held in the Stour valley, Kent, England.
It was founded by the countertenor Alfred Deller in 1962.
The principal venue is a medieval church, All Saints' Church, Boughton Aluph. In the initial years it also included exhibition of paintings, organized by the painter John Ward.

After the death of Alfred Deller in 1979, his son Mark Deller continued the festival. In 2012 it celebrated its fiftieth birthday and the centenary of its founder.

References

External links
 Official Website

Early music festivals